Globtik Tokyo was one of three oil tankers in its class.  At the time her keel was laid in 1972 she was the largest supertanker in the world at 378.85 meters (1,242 feet) and 483,684 tonnes (dwt).  She held that distinction until 1973 when her sister ship the Globtik London was launched. Identical in size the London was larger by 276 dead weight tonnes (dwt).  Both ships had a hold capacity of 580 million liters (3.65 million US barrels).

Owned by Globtik Tankers, London they were built by Ishikawajima Harima Heavy Industries in Kure Japan, now known as IHI Corporation. Both ships have been retired from service and broken up for scrap, the London in 1985 and the Tokyo in 1986.

The third and largest ship in this class was the 484276 dwtNissei Maru owned by Tokyo Tankers built in 1975 and scrapped in 2003.

Propulsion
The Tokyo was powered by steam turbines totaling 45,000 horsepower geared to a single shaft.  The drive system was capable of 16 knots, 17 under ballasted load conditions (empty hold).  Surprisingly nimble for a ship her size, she had a turning circle shorter than three times her length and could stop in under three miles with her single screw in reverse.

See also
List of world's longest ships

References

Tankers of the United Kingdom
Tankers of Liberia
1972 ships